Gymnoscelis albicaudata is a moth in the family Geometridae. It is found in the north-eastern Himalayas and on Peninsular Malaysia, Java, Bali, Borneo, the Philippines, Taiwan and Japan. The habitat consists of upper montane forests.

References

Moths described in 1897
Gymnoscelis
Moths of Japan